Proper Manors is a dramatic soap opera about the small, fictional town of Proper, USA and its inhabitants. The web-based TV series is filmed and produced primarily in Salt Lake City and Ogden, Utah, where most of the cast and crew are from. The show was created by Pietro D'Alessio and is based loosely on his experiences growing up in various locations across the country.

Overview

The show is about the town of Proper, USA, and specifically focuses on the trials and tribulations faced by the adults and teenagers in the community. In season 1 of the show, one of Proper's teens, Joey Sorrento, and his peers begin to discover shortly after graduation that they are merely pawns in the games that the adults of Proper play. In season 2, with the introduction of new characters, scandals continue to unfold and the town is confronted with the mysterious murders of several of its teens. Season 3, currently in production, brings a whole new level of drama as the audience gets to know the residents of Proper on a much more intimate level.

Development

Creator Pietro D'Alessio was a fan of soap operas growing up and came up with the initial idea for Proper Manors when he was in 7th grade. The main character, Joey, and the challenges he faces in the show are loosely based on D'Alessio and experiences from his own youth. Originally slated to be produced in New Hampshire, Proper Manors began production in Ogden, Utah on March 17, 2012 and remains in production today.

Cast

Episodes
As of September 17, 2015, the show has aired 85 episodes over 3 seasons.

Season 1 (2012-2013)

Season 2 (2013-2014)

Season 3 (2015-present)

References

External links
 Proper Manors Official Website
Proper Manors Amazon
Proper Manors Facebook
 Proper Manors Twitter
 Proper Manors YouTube Channel
 Proper Manors Blip Channel

Internet soap operas
American television soap operas
American drama web series